Shorea falcifera is an endangered species of plant in the family Dipterocarpaceae.

Distribution
It is found in Sumatra, Peninsular Malaysia and Borneo.

See also
List of Shorea species

References

falcifera
Trees of Sumatra
Trees of Peninsular Malaysia
Trees of Borneo
Endangered plants
Taxonomy articles created by Polbot